This is a list of members of the Western Australian Legislative Assembly between the 1953 election and the 1956 election, together known as the 21st Parliament.

Notes
 On 19 March 1953, the Labor member for Kimberley, Aubrey Coverley, died. Labor candidate John Rhatigan won the resulting by-election on 16 May 1953.
 On 21 September 1955, the Labor member for Bunbury, Frank Guthrie, died. Liberal candidate George Roberts won the resulting by-election on 29 October 1955.

Members of Western Australian parliaments by term